Ericka Morales Alarcón (born 17 December 1994) is a Bolivian footballer who plays as a defender for Mundo Futuro FC and the Bolivia women's national team.

Early life
Morales hails from the Santa Cruz Department.

Club career
Morales played for Chacales, Florida, Gerimex, Marmolcruz, Mundo Futuro and Deportivo Ita in Bolivia. She appeared at four Copa Libertadores Femenina editions (2013, 2014, 2017 and 2018).

International career
Morales represented Bolivia at the 2012 South American U-17 Women's Championship, the 2013 Bolivarian Games and the 2014 South American U-20 Women's Championship. She capped at senior level during the 2014 South American Games and three Copa América Femenina editions (2014, 2018 and 2022).

References

1994 births
Living people
Sportspeople from Santa Cruz de la Sierra
Bolivian women's footballers
Women's association football defenders
Bolivia women's international footballers
Competitors at the 2014 South American Games